The Yesenankaty is a river in Syrym District, West Kazakhstan Region, Kazakhstan.

The river is fed mainly by groundwater and rain. Its waters are used to irrigate agricultural fields.

Course 
It heads roughly westwards, bending southwestwards in mid course. In its final stretch it bends northwestwards and again southwestwards. Finally it reaches lake Shalkar and enters it from the eastern shore.

See also
List of rivers of Kazakhstan

References

External links
DETERMINATION OF THE TOURIST POSITION OF LAKES OF WESTERN AND CENTRAL KAZAKHSTAN BY SPACE SURVEY
IMPACT OF CLIMATE CHANGE AND ANTHROPOGENIC ACTIVITIES ON THE WATER AND BIOLOGICAL RESOURCES OF LAKE SHALKAR IN WESTERN KAZAKHSTAN

Rivers of Kazakhstan
West Kazakhstan Region
Endorheic basins of Asia